Eulophia pulchra, commonly known as the gonzo orchid, is a plant in the orchid family and is native to areas from Tanzania and Mozambique to the Western Pacific Ocean. It is a terrestrial orchid with crowded, above-ground pseudobulbs, two or three leaves and pale yellowish green flowers with dull purple or red markings. It grows in plant litter in rainforests.

Description
Flowering occurs between April and June in Australia, between October and December in China and December to February in Africa. The species in Australia is reported to be self-pollinating and the flowers to barely open.

Taxonomy and naming
The gonzo orchid was first formally described in 1822 by Louis-Marie Aubert du Petit-Thouars who gave it the name Limodorum pulchrum. The description was published in Histoire particuliere des plantes Orchidees recueillies sur les trois iles Australes D'Afrique. In 1840, John Lindley changed the name to Eulophia pulchra. The specific epithet (pulchra) is a Latin word meaning “beautiful", "pretty", "fine" or "lovely".

A study of the molecular phylogeny of the subtribe Eulophiinae published in 2014 considered that this species was more closely allied with the genus Oeceoclades, but the move has not been accepted by the World Checklist of Selected Plant Families and the name Oeceoclades pulchra is regarded as a synonym.

Distribution and habitat
Eulophia pulchra grows in leaf litter in rainforests. It occurs in Tanzania, Zimbabwe, Madagascar, India, Taiwan, Cambodia, Indonesia, Laos, Malaysia, New Guinea, the Philippines, Sri Lanka, Thailand, Vietnam, the Mascarene Islands, tropical north Queensland and some islands in the western Pacific Ocean.

References

pulchra
Plants described in 1822
Orchids of Tanzania
Orchids of Madagascar
Orchids of India
Orchids of Taiwan
Orchids of Cambodia
Orchids of Indonesia
Orchids of Laos
Orchids of Malaysia
Orchids of the Philippines
Orchids of Sri Lanka
Orchids of Thailand
Orchids of Vietnam
Orchids of Queensland